The French Federation of Conjurers (FFAP) (Fédération Française des Artistes Prestidigitateurs) is a regional member organisation of FISM. As of 2013, Serge Odin is the president of the organisation.

See also 

 Fédération Internationale des Sociétés Magiques (FISM)

References

External links 

 

Organizations based in France
Magic organizations
Organizations established in 1903